"Don't U Eva" was the first single from Australian artist Sarah Blasko's debut album The Overture & the Underscore.

In Australia, the song was ranked #27 on Triple J's Hottest 100 of 2004.

It contained an exclusive original composition "Fall Down", a frequent appearance in Sarah's live shows, and "Into the Great Wide Open", a Tom Petty and the Heartbreakers cover originally found on the Heartbreaker's 1991 album of the same name.

Ben Lee makes a cameo appearance as the "A&R man" in "Into the Great Wide Open". He, Nadav & Edo Khan & Old Man River also sing backing vocals on this track.

It received a very limited release of around 1000 copies before being deleted.

Track listing
"Don't U Eva" (edit) - 3:53
"All Coming Back" - 3:15
"Fall Down" - 4:06
"Into the Great Wide Open" - 3:51

All tracks written by Sarah Blasko & Robert F Cranny except track 4 written by Tom Petty and Jeff Lynne.

External links
Sarah Blasko's official site
Sarah Blasko fan site
Sarah Blasko Forum
Dew Process Records (Australia)
Low Altitude Records (United States)

2004 singles
2004 songs
Dew Process singles